Pennington is an unincorporated community in Morgan County, in the U.S. state of Georgia.

History
A post office called Pennington was established in 1882, and remained in operation until 1907. J.C. Pennington, an early postmaster, gave the community his last name.

References

Unincorporated communities in Morgan County, Georgia
Unincorporated communities in Georgia (U.S. state)